Wolaita Dicha Sport Club (Amharic: ወላይታ ድቻ ስፖርት ክለብ) is a professional football club based in Sodo, Ethiopia. They play in the Ethiopian Premier League, the top division of Ethiopian football.

History

Establishment 
The club was established in 2009 by the Welayta Development Association. The club is partly funded by local government.  They are the champions of the 2017 Ethiopian Cup. After being established by the Wolaitta Development Association in 2009, the club was promoted several times until they finally entered the top division in the 2013–14 season

Domestic and African Success (2013-present) 
The club has enjoyed moderate success in the top division avoiding relegation in each of the last 4 seasons. In the 2016–2017 season the club had its most successful run in the Ethiopian Cup, winning the trophy for the first time in its short history. The current coach Zenebe Fisseha was hired in November 2017. 

By virtue of winning its first domestic cup in 2017, the club qualified for the 2018 CAF Confederation Cup. In the first round of the competition Wolaitta Dicha were matched up against Tanzanian side Zimamoto F.C. The first leg ended in a draw in Tanzania, but on the return leg they were able to get a narrow 1–0 victory in front of a home crowd in Hawassa helping them win 2–1 on aggregate and advance to the round of 16. In the round 16 they were drawn against Egyptian giants Zemalek SC, five times former champions of Africa. First leg saw Wolaitta Dicha edged out Zamalek in a hard-fought 2–1 win at Hawassa Stadium in Ethiopia. The return leg at El Salam stadium in Cairo ended 2–1 in regulation in the favor of Zemalek making the teams level on aggregate (2–2) and leading to a penalty shootout. The underdog Wolaitta Dicha side eventually went on to win on penalties 4–3, eliminating Zemalek in the process and producing one of the biggest shocks in the competition's history. They were eliminated in the next round of the tournament by Tanzanian side Young African S.C. 2–1 on aggregate.

In January 2021, Dellegn Dechassa was sacked as head coach after a poor start to the season.

Name and logo 
The team name is from two words in the Wolaytta language ("Wolaitta" = the name of the ethnic group and "Dicha" = development. Literally meaning, development of Wolaitta or the team runs the development of Wolaitta.

The Wolaitta Dicha Club logo is a blue badge with a soccer ball at its center and the traditional Wolaitta colors of black, red and yellow running as a stripe through the bottom third of the badge. The badge also shows an enset, a typical leafy plant native to the SNNPR and very common in Wolayita Zone.

Stadium 
Currently the team plays at the Sodo Stadium. The team also uses Hawassa International Stadium in the city of Hawassa, Ethiopia especially during continental competitions like during the 2018 CAF Confederations Cup. In October 2018 the team announced that Soddo Stadium would undergo renovations during the 2018–19 season requiring the team to use another stadium, Bodeti, during part of the season.

Support 
 
Wolaitta Dicha fans are distinguished by their fervent display of Wolaitta culture through cultural clothing and dance. Fans often wear intricately designed black, yellow and red colored scarves made by the Wolaitta people and dance in the traditional styles of the Wolaitta people as well. The players on the team often feed on this energy before and after matches with some dancing along with the fans as they enter and leave the stadium.

Departments 
Wolaita Dicha SC has different sporting departments, such as Wolaita Dicha Volleyball Team and Wolaita Dicha U-20 Football team. In 2021 the U20 team was disbanded due to budgetary constraints on the club. However, it was returned to the league competition for 2021/22 tournament.

Honors

Domestic 
 Ethiopian Cup: 1
 2017

African 
 CAF Confederation Cup: 1 appearance
 2018 – Group stage

Players

First-team squad 
As of 7 March 2021

Club Officials
General Manager:  Wondimu Samuel Herano 

Technical Director:  ...

Fan Union President:  Mikael Wadan

Coaching and Medical Staff

Head coach:  Tsegaye Kidane-mariyam

Assistant coach: Tassew Tadesse

Goalkeeper coach: Zelalem Mathiwos Ade

Medical BSC : Abera Mena Aga

Condemnation : Barka Bakalo Badacho

Former Players 

 Mubarek Shikur

References

External links
http://www.fussball-statistiken.com/?sport=soccer&page=team&id=25717&view=matches&localization_id=it
Soccerway
https://www.europlan-online.de/wolaita-soddo-stadium/verein/12064

Wolayita
Football clubs in Ethiopia
Sport in the Southern Nations, Nationalities, and Peoples' Region
Sodo
Sport in Wolayita Zone